Russian Industrial Tribute to Die Krupps is a 2013 tribute album to the German industrial/EBM band, Die Krupps, by various artists.

Track listing
Disc one "Metal Works"
"To the Hilt " (II - The Final Option, 1993) - Type V Blood
"The Gods of Void" (Paradise Now, 1997) - Bog-Morok
"Risikofaktor (Panzertank Version)" (The Machinists of Joy, 2013) - Artificial Sun Union
"Reconstruction" (Paradise Now, 1997) - Сонцесвiт
"Crossfire" (II - The Final Option, 1993) - Dexessus
"The Last Flood" (III - Odyssey of the Mind, 1995) - Rosa Infra
"Iron Man" (II - The Final Option, 1993) - Mystterra
"Paradise of Sin" (II - The Final Option, 1993) - Игольчатый смех
"Fatherland" (II - The Final Option, 1993) - Reactor
"5 Millionen" (Too Much History Vol. 1: Electro Years, 2007) - Panzertank
"Fur einen Augenblick" (Volle Kraft voraus!, 1982) - Schwarztag
"Alive" (III - Odyssey of the Mind, 1995) - Magik Brite
"Moving Beyond" (Paradise Now, 1997) - Ungrace
"Risikofaktor" (The Machinists of Joy, 2013) - Artificial Sun Union

Disc two "Electro Works"
"Machineries of Joy " (The Machinists of Joy, 2013) - DBS
"Tod und Teufel" (Volle Kraft voraus!, 1982) - Distorted World
"Odyssey of the Mind" (III - Odyssey of the Mind, 1995) - Electric Resistance
"Goldfinger" (Volle Kraft voraus!, 1982) - Nova State Machine
"Black Beauty White Heat" (Paradise Now, 1997) - C_File
"Volle Kraft voraus" (Volle Kraft voraus!, 1982) - Anthracitic Moths
"Scent" (III - Odyssey of the Mind, 1995) - Sector 516
"Doppelgänger" (I, 1992) - t-U.Bus
"Low Life High Tech" (I, 1992) - Strong Product
"Der Amboss" (Too Much History Vol. 1: Electro Years, 2007) - Ultimate Soldier
"Stahlwerksinfonie" (Stahlwerksinfonie & Wahre Arbeit - Wahrer Lohn, 1993) - Range Of Dives
"Risikofaktor (Russian Version)" (The Machinists of Joy, 2013) - Artificial Sun Union

See also
 Die Krupps
 Industrial music

References

External links 
 Russian Industrial Tribute To Die Krupps at Discogs

Tribute albums
2013 compilation albums